Arthur Rhodes is a baseball player.

Arthur Rhodes may also refer to:
Arthur Rhodes (cricketer) (1906–1957), English cricketer
Arthur Rhodes (politician) (1859–1922), New Zealand politician
Arthur Rhodes (footballer), English footballer